Jaydasht (also Romanized as Jāydasht; also known as Jā Dasht) is a village in Jaydasht Rural District, in the Central District of Firuzabad County, Fars Province, Iran. At the 2006 census, its population was 6,389, in 1,294 families.

References 

Populated places in Firuzabad County